Yardimli District is one of the 66 districts of Azerbaijan. It is located in the south-east of the country and belongs to the Lankaran-Astara Economic Region. The district borders the districts of Jalilabad, Masally, Lerik, and the Ardabil Province of Iran. Its capital and largest city is Yardimli. As of 2020, the district had a population of 68,000.

History 
The district was called the village Vargaduz, part of Lankaran Uyezd from 1920 to 1930. Since 1930, it has been renamed the Vargaduz district. It has been named Yardimli region since 1938 and the center of the district was Yardimli.

Geography
The rayon borders upon Iran (length of the state border in the south and west is equal to 96 km) and Lerik District (40 km), Masally District (11 km), Jalilabad District (20 km) of Azerbaijan. Yardimli is located within the mountainous region in the southern-eastern part of Azerbaijan, within 39 ° -38 ° north longitude, 48 ° -49 ° east longitude. The length of the border with Lerik from the south is 40 km, from east to Masalli is 11 km, from north-east to Jalilabad region is 20 km. The length of the state border with the northern and western is 96 km with the Islamic Republic of Iran. The Vilesh River is the longest and full-flowing river of the rayon. Its length is equal to 11 km.

The region covers 66.720 hectares of land. Forest in the district covers 20,536 hectares. Yardimli land zones consist of mountain-forest-brown soils, brown-mountain-forest lands, mountain-meadow lands. The mechanical components of the soils are overwhelming gill, clay, medium gill. The Vilash Stream is the biggest waterway in the district. Allar, Peshtasar, Solgard, and Valishli waterways are the valleys of the Vilash Stream. The area consists of the Talysh Mountains (the highest peak of the locale, in height 2490 m), Pashtasa mountain range (the tallest peak within the locale is Pechtasar, in height 2244 m) and is encompassed by Mount Burwar.

Within the woods, valuable trees are beech, hornbeam, mammoth birch, rainbow, bushes, hips, oak, gulls. Within the timberlands, there are wild animals such as foxes, wolves, pigs, squirrels, jackals and badgers, as well as wild cat and beech.

Climate 
Climate is warm, ordinary, sodden, winter is delicate, spring is hot. The average yearly temperature is +11.9 degrees C, the rainfall is 586 mm, the wind is west-south, the average speed is 1.6meters per second, the depth of groundwater is 4,5 meters, and the seismic rating is 7 points.

Demography

Population 
According to the State Statistics Committee, as of 2019, the population of city recorded 67,000 persons, which increased by 17,000 persons (about 34 percent) from 50,000 persons in 2000. 34,300 of total population are men, 32,700 are women. In 2018, more than 29,6 percent of the population (about 19,600 persons) consists of young people and teenagers aged 14–29.

Ethnic structure

Economy 
In 2015, 94 million 583 thousand manats gross product was produced in the region, which is 8.8% more than compared with the same period last year and 10.3 times more than in comparison with 2003. Per capita production increased by 3.64 times compared to 2003, by 7% compared with the previous year and amounted to 1471 manat.

Institution 
There are 80 secondary schools in the district, including 42 full-time secondary schools, 22 secondary schools, 16 primary schools, 3 pre-schools and 5 out-of-school institutions.

Gallery

References 

 
Districts of Azerbaijan